Roberto Ravaglia (born 26 May 1957 in Venice, Italy) is a former auto racing driver, who currently runs ROAL Motorsport, who operate a Chevrolet operation in the World Touring Car Championship. Before retiring in 1997, he was one of the most successful touring car racing drivers, primarily for BMW, and won seven titles in four different championships.

Racing career
He was twice Italian karting champion and raced in Formula 3 in the early 1980s. In 1984 he made his touring car debut, becoming European Touring Car Championship champion in 1986, and successfully defending the title in 1987 and 1988 (though in 1987 it was the World Touring Car Championship), with some races outside Europe including the Macau Grand Prix Guia Touring Car races and the James Hardie 1000 in Australia. Later in the 1988 season he was unable to defend his Macau win due to breaking a rib in a road accident driving his Fiat Uno. He switched with BMW to the DTM in 1989, and the Italian Superturismo Championship in 1990, winning both on the first attempt. He was also champion in 1991 and 1993. One of the few unsuccessful seasons of his career was 1996 in the British Touring Car Championship, despite finishing a credible 6th and picking up a win at the British GP support race. He also came in 4th at Supertourismo that year. He was now approaching 40 and did not win another championship as a driver.

Roberto Ravaglia was also successful in the famed Spa 24 Hours race at the Circuit de Spa-Francorchamps in Belgium, winning the race three times. He won his first 24 hours in 1985 driving a BMW 635 CSi partnered by Formula One drivers Gerhard Berger and Marc Surer. He followed that win with a 3rd place in 1986 and second in 1987 before winning again in 1988 in a BMW M3 partnered by Dieter Quester and Altfrid Heger. His last win in the Ardennes round the clock classic came in 1994. Again driving a BMW, this time the BMW 318is partnered by Thierry Tassin and Alexander Burgstaller.

Ravaglia made three visits to Australia during his racing career, all to drive in the Bathurst 1000. In his debut race in 1985 he finished a fine second with Venezuelan Johnny Cecotto in the Schnitzer BMW 635 CSi which had earlier in the year finished 2nd at Spa, with both drivers sharing the "Rookie of the Year" award. The car, run by Australian Greg "Pee Wee" Siddle and under the name of "Goold Motorsport" and sponsored by retired Australian racer and successful tyre retailer Bob Jane, was initially to be driven by Formula One drivers Riccardo Patrese and Gerhard Berger, but the race was run on the same day as the European Grand Prix at Brands Hatch in England. Ravaglia and Cecotto's effort was all the more impressive considering that their Sebring Orange 635 CSi was down on power throughout qualifying and the race with a small electrical gremlin which the Schnitzer mechanics didn't manage to successfully cure.

He returned in 1986, again in a Schnitzer 635 for Goold Motorsport, this time painted in BMW's famous cut-away paint scheme, and initially qualified a surprising 2nd before ending up 9th on the grid after the "Hardies Heroes" Top 10 run-off. To his credit Ravaglia stated his time wouldn't have been possible in qualifying proper without the tow he got from one of the faster V8 Holden Commodore's on the run up Mountain Straight and on the almost 2 km long Conrod Straight, and attributed that lack of a tow in the runoff for his falling to 9th. Partnering former ETCC champion Dieter Quester his race unfortunately ended early when he clashed on lap 2 of 163 with the Jaguar XJS of 1985 winner John Goss. In an uncharacteristic show of raw emotion, Ravaglia physically attacked Goss in the pits after Goss finished his opening driving stint believing the Australian to be totally at fault for the accident and had to be restrained by his team. He later apologised to Goss and professed regret for his actions. Goss, who said in an interview with race broadcaster Channel 7 that he was "astounded" about incident in the pits (but didn't name Ravaglia as the other driver), declined the option from race officials to have action taken against the Italian believing it to be just "one of those things".

Ravaglia returned to Australia for two rounds of the inaugural World Touring Car Championship. The first being the 1987 James Hardie 1000, which was a disaster for the Schnitzer team and Roberto. After crashing his BMW M3 at the top of the mountain during qualifying he suffered heavy bruising to his ribs which required strapping. Following his final stint at the wheel during the race he was taken to the tracks medical centre after collapsing from exhaustion and dehydration from the physical effort of having to drive the little car around the 6.213 km long Mount Panorama Circuit with bruised ribs that were reportedly strapped too tight, making it hard for him to breathe. His last race in Australia was a week later in the Bob Jane T-Marts 500 at the Calder Park Raceway in Melbourne, a unique track that combined the 2.280 km (1.417 mi) road course with the then new 1.801 km (1.119 mi) NASCAR style high banked "Thunderdome". Again teamed with Italian Emanuele Pirro, the pair qualified their M3 9th, but would enjoy a much better race than at Bathurst, finishing 2nd behind the Steve Soper / Pierre Dieudonné Texaco Ford Sierra RS500.

Roberto Ravaglia was also successful in other 24-hour races, twice winning the famous Nürburgring 24 Hours. His first win came in 1989 driving a BMW M3 with another F1 driver (and regular ETCC/WTCC co-driver) Emanuele Pirro and Frenchman Fabien Giroix. His last 24-hour win at the famous Nürburgring was in 1995 driving a BMW 320i with Marc Duez and Alexander Burgstaller.

Team management
In 2001, he founded his own racing team, Ravaglia Motorsport (now ROAL Motorsport), with Aldo Preo. The team took part in the European Touring Car Championship with support from BMW Motorsport, and their driver Peter Kox won the Super Production class championship in the first season. The entry name of the BMW squad was BMW Team Germany in 2001, but it changed to BMW Team Spain in the next season and has been BMW Team Italy-Spain since 2003. The team currently competes in the World Touring Car Championship.

Racing Career Highlights

as Driver 
 1985
 Winner of the 24 Hours of Spa
 1986
 European Touring Car Championship champion
 1987
 World Touring Car Championship champion
 Winner of the Guia Race
 1988
 European Touring Car Championship champion
 Winner of the 24 Hours of Spa
 1989
 Deutsche Tourenwagen Meisterschaft (DTM) champion
 Winner of the 24 Hours Nürburgring Nordschleife
 1990
 Italian Touring Car Championship champion
 1991
 Italian Touring Car Championship champion
 1992

 Third in Guia Race
 1993
 Italian Touring Car Championship champion
 1994
 Winner of the 24 Hours of Spa
 1995
 Winner of the 24 Hours Nürburgring Nordschleife

as Team director 
 2001
 FIA European Super Tourring Championship Super Production class champion for Peter Kox (Ravaglia BMW)
 2005
 Italian Superturismo Championship champion for Alessandro Zanardi (Ravaglia BMW)

Career results
Results sourced from Driver Database.

Complete European Touring Car Championship results
Results sourced from History of Touring Car Racing.

(key) (Races in bold indicate pole position) (Races in italics indicate fastest lap)

Complete Deutsche Tourenwagen Meisterschaft results
(key) (Races in bold indicate pole position) (Races in italics indicate fastest lap)

Complete World Touring Car Championship results
(key) (Races in bold indicate pole position) (Races in italics indicate fastest lap)

Complete World Sportscar Championship results
(key) (Races in bold indicate pole position) (Races in italics indicate fastest lap)

Complete FIA GT Championship results
(key) (Races in bold indicate pole position) (Races in italics indicate fastest lap)

Complete British Touring Car Championship results
(key) (Races in bold indicate pole position - 1 point awarded all races 1996 only) (Races in italics indicate fastest lap)

Complete Super Tourenwagen Cup results
(key) (Races in bold indicate pole position) (Races in italics indicate fastest lap)

Complete Bathurst 1000 results

References

External links 
 Profile - by FIA GT official website

1957 births
Living people
Italian racing drivers
World Touring Car Championship drivers
World Touring Car Champions
British Touring Car Championship drivers
Deutsche Tourenwagen Masters drivers
Deutsche Tourenwagen Masters champions
FIA GT Championship drivers
24 Hours of Le Mans drivers
Italian Formula Three Championship drivers
FIA European Formula 3 Championship drivers
Auto racing crew chiefs
World Sportscar Championship drivers
24 Hours of Spa drivers
European Touring Car Championship drivers
Sports car racing team owners
BMW M drivers
Schnitzer Motorsport drivers
TOM'S drivers
Nürburgring 24 Hours drivers